Napoleon Potyguara Lazzarotto, better known as Poty (Curitiba, March 29, 1924 – Curitiba, May 8, 1998) was a Brazilian artist. His murals - often made of ceramic tiles - can be seen in many localities of Brazil as well as in Portugal, France and Germany.

Nonetheless, most of Poty's works were done in his hometown: Curitiba. Therefore, the artist mosaics, spread out through the capital of Paraná, are among the main icons of the city.

References
 

1924 births
1998 deaths
People from Curitiba
Brazilian artists
Brazilian muralists
Brazilian ceramists
Brazilian people of Italian descent
Brazilian printmakers
20th-century ceramists